The second and final season of the American streaming television series The Punisher, which is based on the Marvel Comics character of the same name, revolves around Frank Castle saving a girl from being murdered, forcing him to decide if he should embrace his life as the Punisher. It is set in the Marvel Cinematic Universe (MCU), sharing continuity with the films and other television series of the franchise. The season was produced by Marvel Television in association with ABC Studios and Bohemian Risk Productions, with Steven Lightfoot serving as showrunner.

Jon Bernthal stars as Frank Castle, with principal cast members Ben Barnes, Amber Rose Revah, and Jason R. Moore returning from the first season. They are joined by Josh Stewart, Floriana Lima, and Giorgia Whigham. Former series regular Deborah Ann Woll returns in a guest capacity. A second season of The Punisher was ordered in December 2017, a month after the first season was released. The new cast members were added in February 2018. Filming began in New York City the next month and concluded in August.

The 13-episode season was released on January 18, 2019. Netflix canceled the series on February 18, 2019.

Episodes

Cast and characters

Main
 Jon Bernthal as Frank Castle / Punisher
 Ben Barnes as Billy Russo / Jigsaw
 Amber Rose Revah as Dinah Madani
 Jason R. Moore as Curtis Hoyle
 Josh Stewart as John Pilgrim
 Floriana Lima as Krista Dumont
 Giorgia Whigham as Amy Bendix

Recurring
 Royce Johnson as Brett Mahoney
 Alexa Davalos as Beth Quinn
 Corbin Bernsen as Anderson Schultz
 Annette O'Toole as Eliza Schultz
 Jordan Dean as Jake Nelson
 Samuel Gomez as José
 Jimi Stanton as Todd
 Brett Bartholomew as Phillip

Notable guests

 Rob Morgan as Turk Barrett
 Tony Plana as Rafael Hernandez
 Mary Elizabeth Mastrantonio as Marion James
 Deborah Ann Woll as Karen Page

Production

Development
A second season of The Punisher was ordered by Netflix in December 2017, less than a month after the first season was released. Showrunner Steve Lightfoot had an idea of what a second season would be when he first knew what the "journey of season 1" was at the start of his work on the series, and did not let the fan reaction to the first season affect his plans since "some people love it, some people hate it, some people are in the middle. My personal opinion with that stuff is you just have to be true to the character and the story you choose to tell." The season consists of 13 episodes.

Writing and design
Lightfoot felt the theme for the season was Frank Castle "adopting the mantle" of the Punisher. The season begins with Castle traveling across the United States as a way for him to get "a look at the country he fought for but has never really seen" according to Lightfoot. Costume designer Lorraine Calvert gave Castle a "more relaxed" look while he is traveling, having him wear blue jeans. Castle eventually puts back on another vest with the character's well-known skull symbol, with Lightfoot and Jon Bernthal working to make that "an integral, plot-driven moment" in the season. Bernthal felt they had "figured out a very intelligent, very tactical reason, a very psychologically tactical reason to wear it" with it making "a lot of sense". Lightfoot also spoke to the inclusion of Karen Page in the season, feeling the relationship between her and Castle would continue "to be very important".

The makeup department worked to realistically place the scars on Billy Russo's face, who is still recovering from his injuries and is suffering from brain damage. Though Russo resembles the character Jigsaw from the comics, he does not take on that name in the season. Ben Barnes also shaved his head for the role this season and adopts a thicker, rougher, New York accent, "more akin to his Bensonhurst roots". Barnes felt Russo had a vulnerability in the season similar to Vincent D'Onofrio's portrayal of Wilson Fisk in the first season of Daredevil. Dinah Madani has become "fixated" on Russo, visiting at the hospital daily with complete "tunnel-vision on him". Amber Rose Revah added that Madani is "self-medicating" after the events of the first season, resorting to drinking and promiscuous behavior. As Krista Dumont is "[v]ery uptight [and] doesn’t want to let anyone into her personal world", Calvert worked to make her wardrobe equally concealing. Doing this "became a really important part of her character, to hide behind the facade of the clothes that cover her up."

Casting
Stars returning for the season were confirmed in February 2018, including Jon Bernthal as Frank Castle / Punisher, Ben Barnes as Billy Russo, Amber Rose Revah as Dinah Madani, and Jason R. Moore as Curtis Hoyle. Announced as joining them for the season were Josh Stewart as John Pilgrim, Floriana Lima as Krista Dumont, and Giorgia Whigham as Amy Bendix, with Corbin Bernsen as Anderson Schultz and Annette O'Toole as Eliza Schultz announced in May. Deborah Ann Woll was confirmed to be reprising her role as Karen Page in December 2018.

Filming
Filming for the season had begun by March 10, 2018, in The Bellmores, New York. Filming took place in Albany, New York, in mid-July 2018, with production on the season concluding in August 2018.

Release
A teaser for the season released in January 2019. The episodes were released on Netflix worldwide, on January 18, 2019. The season, along with the additional Punisher season and the other Marvel Netflix series, was removed from Netflix on March 1, 2022, due to Netflix's license for the series ending and Disney regaining the rights. The season became available on Disney+ in the United States, Canada, United Kingdom, Ireland, Australia, and New Zealand on March 16, ahead of its debut in Disney+'s other markets by the end of 2022.

Reception

Audience viewership 
According to Parrot Analytics, which looks at consumer engagement in consumer research, streaming, downloads, and on social media, The Punisher was the most wanted streaming original series across all platforms in the United States, during the week of January 27 to February 2, 2019.

Critical response 
The review aggregator website Rotten Tomatoes reported a 61% approval rating with an average rating of 6.70/10 based on 36 reviews. The site's critical consensus reads, "The Punishers second season leaves fans torn between the undeniably action-packed fun and the underwhelming portrayal of the charismatic Frank Castle." Metacritic, which uses a weighted average, assigned a score of 58 out of 100, based on 6 critics, indicating "mixed or average reviews".

Accolades

References

External links
 

2019 American television seasons
02